Freedom Township is one of the nineteen townships of Wood County, Ohio, United States.  The 2010 census found 2,727 people in the township, 1,356 of whom lived in the unincorporated portions of the township.

Geography
Located in the eastern part of the county, it borders the following townships:
Troy Township - north
Woodville Township, Sandusky County - northeast
Madison Township, Sandusky County - east
Scott Township, Sandusky County - southeast corner
Montgomery Township - south
Portage Township - southwest corner
Center Township - west
Webster Township - northwest

The village of Pemberville is located in northern Freedom Township.

Name and history
Freedom Township was established in 1831. The township was named for the American ideal of liberty. Statewide, other Freedom Townships are located in Henry and Portage counties.

Government
The township is governed by a three-member board of trustees, who are elected in November of odd-numbered years to a four-year term beginning on the following January 1. Two are elected in the year after the presidential election and one is elected in the year before it. There is also an elected township fiscal officer, who serves a four-year term beginning on April 1 of the year after the election, which is held in November of the year before the presidential election. Vacancies in the fiscal officership or on the board of trustees are filled by the remaining trustees.

The Freedom Township House is located in Pemberville at the intersection of State Route 105 and Water Street.

References

External links
County website

Townships in Wood County, Ohio
Townships in Ohio